Pophalaj is a village in the Karmala taluka of Solapur district in Maharashtra state, India.

Demographics
Covering  and comprising 439 households at the time of the 2011 census of India, Pophalaj had a population of 2190. There were 1132 males and 1058 females, with 285 people being aged six or younger.

References

Villages in Karmala taluka